Boxing at the 2017 Islamic Solidarity Games was held in Baku Crystal Hall 2, Azerbaijan from 12 to 18 May 2017.

Medalists

Medal table

References

Official Results

External links
Official website

2017 Islamic Solidarity Games
Islamic Solidarity Games
2017
International boxing competitions hosted by Azerbaijan